The Daniel Building is a 20-story, 238 foot (86 m) office building located in downtown Birmingham, Alabama. Built in 1970, the building originally served as a regional office for the engineering and construction company Daniel International. It also served as the corporate headquarters for Daniel International's real estate division, Daniel Realty, which today is known as Daniel Corporation.

In 1993, Compass Bancshares bought the building from Daniel Corporation. After completing an extensive renovation, Compass moved its corporate headquarters into the building from its old headquarters, which had been sold to UAB for expanded administrative offices. The building continues to serve as corporate office space for PNC Financial Services.

It is the tallest building in downtown Birmingham outside of the Central Business District.

On July 5, 2010, a two-alarm electrical fire broke out in the basement of the Daniel Building. There was severe damage to the basement, with water damage to the first floor and smoke damage extending several floors into the building. Employees were relocated to other facilities while the building was repaired.

See also
PNC Financial Services
Birmingham, Alabama
Fluor Corp.

External links
Emporis Website
AL.COM

Skyscraper office buildings in Birmingham, Alabama

Office buildings completed in 1970
International style architecture in Alabama
1970 establishments in Alabama